Joseph Kabagambe (born 3 September 1984) is a Ugandan international footballer who plays for Sudanese club Al-Nil Al-Hasahesa, as a striker.

Career
Born in Mubare Sub-county, Kabale District, Kabagambe began playing football with local sides before joining Horizon F.C. in 2000. Kabagambe has played club football in Rwanda and Sudan.

References

External links

1984 births
Living people
Ugandan footballers
Uganda international footballers
Association football midfielders
Ugandan expatriate footballers
Expatriate footballers in Rwanda
Expatriate footballers in Sudan
SC Villa players
People from Kabale District